Heartbeats and Brainwaves is the eighth album by Detroit rock band Electric Six. It was released on October 11, 2011.
It was released as a CD, digital download and a colored double vinyl set which is sold at the band's live shows.

A video for "Psychic Visions" starring Dick Valentine and directed by Justin J. Lowe was uploaded on April 30, 2012, marking the band's first video for three years.

Track listing

Personnel
 Dick Valentine - vocals
 Tait Nucleus? - synthesizer
 The Colonel - guitar
  - guitar
 Percussion World - drums
 Smorgasbord - bass
 Andy D. - vocals (track 4)
 E. Abbott Joñes - vocals (track 6)
 She Bits - background vocals (track 6)
 Adam Cox - musician
 Audrey Cichocki - musician
 Chad Thompson - musician 
 Liz Whittman - musician 
 Jason Pearce - musician
 Mark Mallman - musician
 Renata Del Signore - musician

Legacy
 The band performed "Hello! I See You" on their first live album Absolute Pleasure.
 The band performed "Hello! I See You" in their concert film Absolute Treasure.
 A demo for the song "Free Samples" was subsequently released on the band's compilation album Mimicry and Memories. 
 A demo for the song "Bleed for the Artist" was subsequently made available online via the band's Soundcloud page after being initially announced for inclusion on Mimicry and Memories but ultimately omitted. 
 Dick Valentine recorded an acoustic version of the song "Heartbeats and Brainwaves" for his solo album Quiet Time.
 The song "Eye Contact" was featured in the band's mockumentary feature film Roulette Stars of Metro Detroit.
 A demo of "Hello! I See You" was subsequently released on The Dick Valentine Raw Collection.
 The band performed stripped down, acoustic versions of "Heartbeats and Brainwaves" and "We Use the Same Products" for their third live album, Chill Out!.

References

2011 albums
Electric Six albums
Metropolis Records albums